The Athletic is a subscription-based sports website that provides national and local coverage in 47 North American cities as well as the United Kingdom. The Athletic also covers national stories from top professional and college sports (National Football League, National Basketball Association, Major League Baseball, NASCAR, NCAA football, NCAA basketball (U.S. only), National Hockey League, mixed martial arts, Major League Soccer (U.S. and Canada only) and association football (U.K. edition only). The Athletics coverage focuses on a mix of long-form journalism, original reporting, and in-depth analysis. Its business model is predicated on dis-aggregating the sports section of local newspapers and reaching non-local fans not reached by a local newspaper.

History 

The Athletic was founded by Alex Mather and Adam Hansmann, former coworkers at subscription-based fitness company Strava, with the mission of producing "smarter coverage for die-hard fans." The company was built as an alternative to the struggling ad-supported models. The Athletic relies on subscription revenue, not advertising revenue, to support the business. Mather and Hansmann believed sports fans would be willing to pay for good reporting and writing, a clean app and no ads. At the time, a few newspapers were trying out paywalls, but the common industry view was that information on the internet needed to be free.

As part of Y Combinator's summer 2016 batch, the site originally launched in Chicago in January 2016, with Jon Greenberg serving as the founding editor, along with Sahadev Sharma (Cubs) and Scott Powers (Blackhawks). Greenberg and Powers previously worked at ESPN Chicago, while Sharma left Baseball Prospectus Cubs vertical to join the website.

Expansion 
In October 2016, The Athletic expanded to a second city, Toronto, to focus on Maple Leafs, Raptors, and Blue Jays coverage. The Athletic hired James Mirtle as editor-in-chief for Toronto. Mirtle had spent over a decade as a sportswriter at The Globe and Mail before joining The Athletic.

A third city, Cleveland, launched in March 2017, with Jason Lloyd as editor-in-chief. The Athletic continued city expansion to Detroit in June 2017.

In August 2017, the site launched in the San Francisco-area market with long-time San Jose Mercury News writers Tim Kawakami as editor-in-chief and Marcus Thompson as columnist. The Athletic also added national coverage with new writers including baseball veteran Ken Rosenthal, shortly after Fox Sports eliminated its entire writing staff, as well as college basketball standout Seth Davis and college football institution Stewart Mandel. Mandel led the launch of the national college football section, "The All-American", at the end of August.

The Athletic expanded into Philadelphia, Minnesota, Pittsburgh, St. Louis, and the rest of Canada in September 2017 bringing local coverage to 15 US and Canadian pro sports markets. The vast majority of expansion was aimed at expanding coverage to underserved hockey fans.

In February 2018, The Athletic announced further expansion into three new cities—New York, Dallas, and Cincinnati—and launched baseball-only coverage in Houston, Los Angeles, San Diego, Arizona, and Kansas City. The site also introduced expanded national MLB coverage with the addition of Jayson Stark, Jim Bowden, Eno Sarris, and editor Emma Span.

The site announced full coverage in Denver and Boston starting in April 2018.  In Denver, The Athletic hired several reporters from The Denver Post. In Boston, the initial staff consisted of beat writers previously employed at The Boston Globe, the Boston Herald, and the Springfield Republicans web portal MassLive. Adding to college football coverage, The Athletic added dedicated beat writers for major programs like Alabama, Georgia, and Tennessee.

In May 2018, the site announced coverage of both domestic and international soccer.  In June 2018, The Athletic increased coverage in Los Angeles and expanded into Buffalo, New York, by hiring several reporters who had been bought out from The Buffalo News the same month.

The Athletic continued market expansion in July 2018 with the addition of Atlanta with former AJC writers David O'Brien and Jeff Schultz, Baltimore, and Wisconsin. The site also added 19 college football writers to cover most of the major NCAA FB programs.

In August 2018, The Athletic launched Fantasy Sports coverage and continued expansion across US markets including Washington, D.C., Carolina, Nashville, Indiana, Miami, and New Orleans. The site also announced expanded NBA reporting with Shams Charania and NFL coverage with Jay Glazer.

The Athletic completed local coverage expansion to all NHL and NFL teams by September 2018 after adding writers in Jacksonville, Houston, Oklahoma, Oregon, and Las Vegas. Memphis was added as the 47th local market covered by The Athletic in October 2018, expanding coverage to all NBA teams.

The Athletic signed three veteran TV journalists in November 2018, including 60 Minutes correspondent Armen Keteyian, in the publication's efforts to produce more video content as a supplement to written coverage.

In May 2019, The Athletic announced an expansion into motorsports coverage featuring veteran journalist Jeff Gluck. While NASCAR will be the dominant focus of coverage, The Athletic aims to be a destination for all motorsports fans by including other major events, such as the Indianapolis 500.

In August 2019, The Athletic expanded to the UK, predominantly covering domestic and international football. The team is led by managing director Ed Malyon and editor-in-chief Alex Kay-Jelski, and includes: Michael Cox, Raphael Honigstein, Daniel Taylor, and many beat reporters.

Sale to The New York Times Company 
The company began exploring a sale to a larger media company in 2021, following continued unprofitability, driven by high expenses and reliance on venture capital funding instead of operational revenue. As of that time, the site had 1.2 million subscribers and $80 million in revenue, having raised $55 million in venture capital funding. Axios entered discussions with The Athletic in March of that year but ultimately declined to make an offer. The New York Times was the leading contender for a potential merger as of May, with Vox Media also expressing interest. Buyout talks between The Athletic and The New York Times ended in June 2021. On November 2, 2021,  reports emerged that sports betting companies DraftKings and Flutter Entertainment, among other companies, were among some of the bidders for the company.

Ultimately, in January 2022, The New York Times Company announced that it would acquire The Athletic for $550 million, in a transaction expected to close in the first quarter of 2022. The Times noted that The Athletic would continue to run independently of the Times, and co-founders Alex Mather and Adam Hansmann would continue to lead the operation.

Funding 

The Athletic has raised a total of $139.5 million over five rounds. The first major funding was provided by Courtside Ventures, which provided $2.3 million in seed funding in Jan 2017. In July 2017, the company raised another $5.4 million in Series A funding also led by Courtside Ventures. In March 2018, the company announced a $20 million third round of funding led by Evolution Media. Mather reported that this money would be invested into expanding coverage to new cities and increasing the number of writers from the then staff of 120. The Athletic raised another $40 million in a Series C funding round in October 2018, co-led by Founders Fund and Bedrock Capital.  The money will be used to invest in expanding teams focused on audience, data and editorial teams, subscriptions, podcasts and video.

As of August 2019, The Athletic had 600,000 paying subscribers with an 80% retention rate year-over-year. Most of its subscribers, 60%, follow sports teams in two or more cities. In September 2020, The Athletic announced 1 million global subscribers, as well as expansion into additional breaking news content formats.

Coverage
As of 2022, The Athletic provides local coverage in 47 cities and regions of North America as well as coverage in the United Kingdom. It includes the 32 National Football League teams, the 30 Major League Baseball teams, the 30 National Basketball Association teams, just 23 of the 32 National Hockey League teams, and 21 NCAA teams.

Investigations 

The Athletic has published multiple investigations regarding workplace misconduct, sexual abuse, and other transgressions in the sports community. In 2018, Athletic journalist Tim Cato published an in-depth report on allegations regarding workplace misconduct within the Dallas Mavericks organization. The report detailed how high-ranking members within the Mavericks organization ignored and tacitly approved of financial misconduct and mental abuse.

In March 2021, The Athletic published an investigation regarding sexual misconduct and abuse at Louisiana State University (LSU). In the report, Brody Miller detailed the rampant sexual misconduct that was present at all levels of the LSU organization, and interviews with former players helped support an investigation conducted by law firm Husch Blackwell.

In September 2021, The Athletic released a report detailing the gross sexual misconduct of association football coach Paul Riley in the NWSL. The report detailed Riley's sexual abuse of several players, namely Sinead Farrelly and Meleana Shim, as well as an unnamed additional player, while coaching at Portland Thorns FC. The report also revealed that the allegations, first reported to the club in 2016, were partially responsible for the decision not to renew his contract in Portland. Riley, however, immediately assumed a new coaching position within the NWSL. The NWSL, and Riley's current team, responded with no comment. Paul Riley denied all allegations. Riley was fired shortly afterward, and the relevant soccer bodies (NWSL, FIFA and the United States Soccer Federation) launched investigations.

References

External links

American sport websites
Internet properties established in 2016
2016 establishments in the United States
Companies based in San Francisco
2022 mergers and acquisitions
The New York Times